Taveta may refer to:

 Taveta people of Southeast Africa
 Taveta language
 Taita-Taveta County, Kenya, formerly Taita-Taveta District
 Taveta, Kenya, a town at the border with Tanzania
 Taveta Constituency, a parliamentary constituency in Kenya
 Taveta (moth), a genus of the family Erebidae